"September Song" is a song by English singer JP Cooper. It is the second single from his debut studio album, Raised Under Grey Skies (2017). The song was released as a digital download in the United Kingdom on 16 September 2016 through Island Records. The song has peaked at number 7 on the UK Singles Chart, and has also reached the top 10 in both Ireland and Sweden. The song was written by Cooper, Jon Hume, Alex Bunker and Mr Hudson.

Background
Talking about the song, Cooper said, "'September Song' in a nutshell is a nostalgic, innocent look at a teenage romance – probably one of your first romances. Looking back as an adult now at how simple things were back then, having those moments of, like, 'I wonder what that person is doing now.' In the UK, September is when you go back to school after the holiday. So that's the idea, this person has been missing this girl all summer – she's a September song, that's what he's looking forward to. We just wanted to write a song that was really sweet and innocent, it wasn't over-sexualized or anything like that."

Music video
A video to accompany the release of "September Song" was first released onto YouTube on 28 November 2016 at a total length of three minutes and thirty-five seconds.

Track listing

Charts

Weekly charts

Year-end charts

Certifications

Release history

Nadine Coyle version

In 2018, Irish recording artist Nadine Coyle released a cover of "September Song". The cover, the third track from Coyle's Nadine EP, was released as a digital download on 9 March 2018 by Virgin EMI Records.

References

2016 singles
2016 songs
JP Cooper songs
Island Records singles
Nadine Coyle songs
Song recordings produced by Xenomania
Songs written by Jon Hume
Songs written by JP Cooper
Songs written by Mr Hudson